Cyril Tourneur (died 28 February 1626) was an English soldier, diplomat and dramatist who wrote The Atheist's Tragedy (published 1611); another (and better-known) play, The Revenger's Tragedy (1607), formerly ascribed to him, is now more generally attributed to Thomas Middleton.

Life
Cyril Tourneur was the son, or possibly the grandson, of Edward Tournor of Canons, Great Parndon (Essex), and his second wife, Frances Baker. He served in his youth Sir Francis Vere and Sir Edward Cecil. His literary activities seem to be concentrated in the period 1600–1613. In 1613 and 1614 he was employed in military and diplomatic service in the Low Countries. In 1625 he was appointed to be secretary to the council of war for the Cádiz Expedition. This appointment was cancelled, but Tourneur sailed in Cecil's company to Cádiz. On the return voyage from the disastrous expedition, he was put ashore at Kinsale with other sick men and died in Ireland on 28 February 1626.

Writings
A difficult allegorical poem called The Transformed Metamorphosis (1600) is Tourneur's earliest extant work; an elegy on the death of Prince Henry, son of James I of England, is the latest (1613). Tourneur's other non-dramatic works include a prose pamphlet, Laugh and Lie Down (1605), some contributions to Sir Thomas Overbury's Book of Characters and an epicede on Sir Francis Vere. This poem conveys the poet's ideal conception of a perfect knight or happy warrior.

Tourneur's primary dramatic work is The Atheist's Tragedy, or The Honest Man's Revenge which was published in 1611. A case has been made by Johan Gerritsen that Tourneur is the author of the first act of The Honest Man's Fortune (1613), a play from the Beaumont & Fletcher canon usually attributed to John Fletcher, Philip Massinger and Nathan Field. In addition there is a lost play, The Nobleman, and the lost Arraignment of London written with Robert Daborne. 

Tourneur's current reputation however rests on The Atheist's Tragedy. It confidently reproduces themes and conventions which are characteristic of medieval morality plays and of Elizabethan memento mori emblems. It uses these conventions in the context of Calvin's Protestant theology. This and Tourneur's other uncontested works, show him to be "a traditional Christian moralist, with a consistent didactic bent." The play recalls Jonson's The Alchemist and Volpone in the character of Languebeau Snuffe, and may also be a response to The Revenge of Bussy D'Amboise.

As regards The Revenger's Tragedy, the play was published anonymously, and was first attributed to Cyril Tourneur by Edward Archer in 1656. The attribution was also made by Francis Kirkman in lists of 1661 and 1671. Critics supporting Tourneur's authorship attribution argued that the tragedy is unlike Middleton's other early dramatic work, and that internal evidence, including some idiosyncrasies of spelling, points to Tourneur. However, the consensus of modern scholarship attributes the play to Middleton, citing stylistic similarities to Middleton's other work and contextual evidence. 

Modern stagings of The Atheist's Tragedy remain few and far between.

Works of Tourneur
 The Atheists Tragedie; or, The Honest Mans Revenge (1611)
 A Funeral Poeme Upon the Death of the Most Worthie and True Soldier, Sir Francis Vere, Knight.. (1609)
 A Griefe on the Death of Prince Henrie, Expressed in a Broken Elegie ..., printed with two other poems by John Webster and Thomas Haywood as Three Elegies on the most lamented Death of Prince Henry (1613)
 The Transformed Metamorphosis (1600), an obscure satire
 The Nobleman, a lost play entered on the Stationers Register (Feb. 15, 1612) as "A Tragecomedye called The Nobleman written by Cyrill Tourneur", the MS. of which was destroyed by John Warburton's cook
 Arraignment of London (1613), stated in a letter of that date from Robert Daborne to Philip Henslowe that Daborne had commissioned Cyril Tourneur to write one act of this play.

References

Notes

Sources
 Gibbons, Brian, (ed). (1991). The Revenger's Tragedy; New Mermaids edition (2nd edition). New York: Norton, 1991
 
  This includes Swinburne's critical assessment of the writer.

Other reading
 Parfitt, George, ed. The Plays of Cyril Tourneur. Cambridge, Cambridge University Press, 1978.
 Higgins, Michael H. 'The Influence of Calvinistic Thought in Tourneur's Atheist's Tragedy''', Review of English Studies'' XIX.75 (Jul 1943), 255-262.

1626 deaths
Military personnel from Essex
English Renaissance dramatists
People from Essex
English soldiers
English diplomats
Year of birth unknown